The Brave New World Tour by Iron Maiden began on 2 June 2000 and ended on 19 January 2001. It supported their 2000 album Brave New World that marked the return of vocalist Bruce Dickinson and guitarist Adrian Smith. In Europe, the tour was called Metal 2000. The initial batch of dates included just one in Iron Maiden's homeland. "Everybody in the band would like to do a thirty-date tour of 1,500-2,000-seaters," maintained Bruce Dickinson, "but we've got a tour booked in Europe this summer and we will be playing to over two million people in two months. Newbridge Memorial Hall will have to wait for a while!"

On 19 January 2001, the band recorded Rock in Rio in front of an audience of 250,000, their second-largest crowd in Rio de Janeiro (the largest crowd being their 1985 Rock in Rio performance during the World Slavery Tour).

The Madison Square Garden concert on 5 August sold out in two hours. Three dates scheduled for Germany, Bulgaria and Greece in mid-July 2000 were cancelled so guitarist Janick Gers could recover after an accident at Mannheim, Germany, on 8 July: he slipped, fell off the stage, sustained a concussion and sprained his back.

Setlist
"Arthur's Farewell" (from the film First Knight) served as the intro for the tour.
 "The Wicker Man" (from Brave New World, 2000)
 "Ghost of the Navigator" (from Brave New World, 2000)
 "Brave New World" (from Brave New World, 2000)
 "Wrathchild" (from Killers, 1981)
 "2 Minutes to Midnight" (from Powerslave, 1984)
 "Blood Brothers" (from Brave New World, 2000)
 "Sign of the Cross" (from The X Factor, 1995)
 "The Mercenary" (from Brave New World, 2000)
 "The Trooper" (from Piece of Mind, 1983)
 "Dream of Mirrors" (from Brave New World, 2000)
 "The Clansman" (from Virtual XI, 1998)
 "The Evil That Men Do" (from Seventh Son of a Seventh Son, 1988)
 "Fear of the Dark" (from Fear of the Dark, 1992)
 "Iron Maiden" (from Iron Maiden, 1980)
Encore
"The Number of the Beast" (from The Number of the Beast, 1982)
 "Hallowed Be Thy Name" (from The Number of the Beast, 1982)
 "Sanctuary" (from Iron Maiden, 1980)

Tracks played at only a few venues:
 "Run to the Hills" (from The Number of the Beast, 1982) (only played in Chile and Brasil)
 "The Fallen Angel" (from Brave New World, 2000)
 "Out of the Silent Planet" (from Brave New World, 2000)
 "Children of the Damned" (from The Number of the Beast, 1982) (only played in London 2002)

Tour dates

Reference

References

External links
 Official website
 Brave New World Tour Dates

Iron Maiden concert tours
2000 concert tours
2001 concert tours
2002 concert tours

fi:Brave New World#Maailmankiertue